Bulbophyllum sect. Didactyle is a section of the genus Bulbophyllum. It is one of six Bulbophyllum sections found in the Americas.

Description
Species in this section have unifoliate pseudobulbs, inflorescence with a thin rachis holding flowers that are distichously arranged. Lateral sepals totally free, petals patent.  Column foot with bilobed apex and shorter than the length of the column.

Distribution
Plants from this section are found from Venezuela, Guyana, Colombia, Paraguay, through Brazil, Bolivia, and Argentina.

Species
Bulbophyllum section Didactyle comprises the following species:

Natural Hybrids

References

Orchid subgenera